The Broken Gate is a lost 1927  American silent drama film directed by James C. McKay and starring Dorothy Phillips, William Collier Jr. and Jean Arthur. It was produced and distributed by Tiffany Pictures.

This film is a remake of a 1920 lost film The Broken Gate.

Cast
Dorothy Phillips as Aurora Lane
William Collier Jr. as Don Lane
Jean Arthur as Ruth Hale
Phillips Smalley as Judge Lucius Henderson
Florence Turner as Miss Julia
Gibson Gowland as Ephraim Adamson
Charles A. Post as Johnny Adamson
Caroline Rankin as Mrs. Ephraim Adamson
Vera Lewis as Invalid
Jack McDonald as Sheriff Dan Cummins
Charles Thurston as Constable Joe Tarbush
Adele Watson as Gossip

References

Bibliography
 Connelly, Robert B. The Silents: Silent Feature Films, 1910-36, Volume 40, Issue 2. December Press, 1998.
 Munden, Kenneth White. The American Film Institute Catalog of Motion Pictures Produced in the United States, Part 1. University of California Press, 1997.

External links

series of cluster stills(archived)

1927 films
American silent feature films
Lost American films
Tiffany Pictures films
American black-and-white films
Remakes of American films
1927 lost films
Films directed by James C. McKay
1920s American films
1920s English-language films